Biały Kościół  is a village in the administrative district of Gmina Strzelin, within Strzelin County, Lower Silesian Voivodeship, in south-western Poland.

The village has a population of 300.

References

Villages in Strzelin County